Sworn to the Dark is the third studio album by Watain and was released on 19 February 2007 on Season of Mist. The album received very positive reviews from music critics and has been described as the band's "breakthrough" album. The song 'Legions of the Black Light' is dedicated to Dissection's vocalist Jon Nödtveidt who committed suicide in 2006.

Critical reception and accolades 

The album received positive reviews from music critics. Chad Bowar of About.com called it "a sinister and forbidding dose of black metal". He went on to say, "You'll hear the droning guitars and frantic blast beats of black metal, but Watain adds a lot of really catchy and melodic riffs and some cool guitar countermelodies." He concluded his review saying, "This is a really well crafted album that's menacing, yet melodic." Eduardo Rivadavia of AllMusic gave the album 4.5 of 5 stars, saying that the band "achieve a perfect balance between Venom or Darkthrone's outright savagery and straightforward execution, and Emperor's spiraling arrangements and progressive orientation". He went on to say that "you'll definitely find more extreme, misanthropic, or adventurous black metal albums than Sworn to the Dark out there, but you'll be hard-pressed to find one more balanced or – and this may sound contradictory for nasty old black metal – enjoyable". Scott Alisoglu of Blabbermouth.net wrote that "Watain is a band concerned not with experimentation or genre-bending, just the creation of ripping black metal songs that burn a hole in the soul and leave a lasting impact on the psyche. It doesn't get much better." The album also made many end-of-year lists, as well. In Terrorizer Secret History of Black Metal (issued in September 2009), it made the number 13 position on their list of "Black Metal's Top 40 Albums".  The AllMusic stuff named it one of their favourite metal albums of 2007.

Track listing

Personnel

Watain 
 Erik Danielsson – vocals, bass
 Pelle Forsberg – guitar
 Håkan Jonsson – drums

Additional personnel 
 Set Teitan – lyrics and guitar solo on "Legions of the Black Light"
 Peter Stjärnvind, Alvaro Lillo, Carlos Aguilar, Tobias Sidegård – guest vocals on "Stellarvore"
 Michayah Belfagor – lyrics of "Darkness and Death"
 Peter In de Betou – mastering
 Ketalodog (Timo Ketola) – artwork
 Erik "Tyrant" Gustavsson – photography
 Tore Stjerna – production, recording, mixing

References 

2007 albums
Southern Lord Records albums
Watain albums
Season of Mist albums